Jake Paltrow (born September 26, 1975) is an American film director, screenwriter and actor. Coming from a family of actors, he is the younger brother of Gwyneth Paltrow and the son of Bruce Paltrow and Blythe Danner.

Personal life 
Paltrow is the son of producer-director Bruce Paltrow and actress Blythe Danner. He had a Bar Mitzvah. He is a first cousin of actress Katherine Moennig and a second cousin of former U.S. congresswoman Gabby Giffords.

In 1999, Paltrow met photographer and artist Taryn Simon, whom he married in 2010; they have two children together.

Career 
Paltrow's most prominent job was directing some NYPD Blue episodes, such as: Andy Appleseed (2003), Brothers Under Arms (2000) and Big Bang Theory (1999), following in his father's footsteps as a television director.

In 2006, he made his debut as a film director with the movie The Good Night, which featured his sister Gwyneth. The movie was released at the 2007 Sundance Film Festival. Paltrow has produced short films about actors for the New York Times. In 2014, he wrote, directed and produced the dystopian sci-fi Western Young Ones.

Filmography

References

External links 

21st-century American male actors
American male film actors
American male screenwriters
American people of Barbadian descent
American people of Belarusian-Jewish descent
American people of English descent
American people of Pennsylvania Dutch descent
American people of Polish-Jewish descent
American television directors
Crossroads School alumni
Film directors from Los Angeles
Living people
Male actors from Los Angeles
Screenwriters from California
Writers from Los Angeles
1975 births
Paltrow family